Santiago Montagner (born 18 April 1995) is an Argentine rugby union player who plays for the national Argentina team The Pumas and Italian team Petrarca Padova in Top10. His playing position is Flanker.

References

External links
 itsrugby Profile

Jaguares (Super Rugby) players
Rugby union flankers
Argentine rugby union players
1995 births
Living people
Asociación Alumni players
Dogos XV players